Blake C. Shields is an American film and television actor.

Biography
Shields was born in Ithaca, New York. He is the second child and has one older brother and two younger sisters. He spent most of his childhood globetrotting the world with his family of six until finally settling down in Israel. After returning to the United States as a precocious and cultured youngster, he devoted much of his time and passion to the Idaho Shakespeare Festival and the theater group the Washington Street Players. He went on to star in major theater productions such as A Midsummer Night's Dream and Hamlet.

In 2000, Shields filmed his first widely released feature film in Boys and Girls opposite Freddie Prinze Jr. He also starred in New Port South, a film written by James Hughes. He was a series regular on Carnivàle and Sleeper Cell. Additional credits include JAG, The Closer, CSI: Crime Scene Investigation, and Cold Case Files.

Shields lives in Los Angeles.  Most recently, Blake played the villain Flint in NBC's Heroes. He was also cast as a serial killer in an episode of Criminal Minds ("Hopeless").

Filmography

Film

Television

External links
 

Year of birth missing (living people)
Living people
Male actors from New York (state)
American male film actors
American male television actors
People from Ithaca, New York
20th-century American male actors
21st-century American male actors